This is a List of military airbases in Russia, including the airbases used by the Russian Air Force, Russian Naval Aviation, National Guard of Russia and aircraft repair depots.

It can be compared with the List of Soviet Air Force bases; virtually no new airbase construction has taken place since 1991. 

The main air armies are the:
 4th Air and Air Defence Forces Army which is part of the Southern Military District
 6th Air and Air Defence Forces Army which is part of the Western Military District
 11th Air and Air Defence Forces Army which is part of the Eastern Military District
 14th Air and Air Defence Forces Army which is part of the Central Military District
 45th Air and Air Defenсe Forces Army part of the Northern Fleet Joint Strategic Command

Units can also be direct reporting and report to the Russian Air Force HQ, including Long Range Aviation and Military Transport Aviation.

See also 
 List of Soviet Air Force bases

References

Military installations of Russia
 *
Russian and Soviet military-related lists
Air forces-related lists